In physics and chemistry , Bragg's law, Wulff–Bragg's condition or Laue–Bragg interference, a special case of Laue diffraction, gives the angles for coherent scattering of waves from a crystal lattice. It encompasses the superposition of wave fronts scattered by lattice planes, leading to a strict relation between wavelength and scattering angle, or else to the wavevector transfer with respect to the crystal lattice. Such law had initially been formulated for X-rays upon crystals. However, It applies to all sorts of quantum beams, including neutron and electron waves at atomic distances, as well as visible light at artificial periodic microscale lattices.

History 

Bragg diffraction (also referred to as the Bragg formulation of X-ray diffraction) was first proposed by Lawrence Bragg and his father, William Henry Bragg, in 1913 in response to their discovery that crystalline solids produced surprising patterns of reflected X-rays (in contrast to that of, say, a liquid).  They found that these crystals, at certain specific wavelengths and incident angles, produced intense peaks of reflected radiation. The derived Bragg's law is a special interpretation of Laue diffraction, where the Braggs interpreted the constructive Laue-Bragg interference in a geometric way by reflection of waves from crystal lattice planes, such that the path-difference becomes a multiple of the incident wavelength. 

Lawrence Bragg explained this result by modeling the crystal as a set of discrete parallel planes separated by a constant parameter . It was proposed that the incident X-ray radiation would produce a Bragg peak if their reflections off the various planes interfered constructively. Although simple, Bragg's law confirmed the existence of real particles at the atomic scale, as well as providing a powerful new tool for studying crystals in the form of X-ray and neutron diffraction. Lawrence Bragg and his father, William Henry Bragg, were awarded the Nobel Prize in physics in 1915 for their work in determining crystal structures beginning with NaCl, ZnS, and diamond. They are the only father-son team to jointly win.

The concept of Bragg diffraction applies equally to neutron diffraction and electron diffraction processes. Both neutron and X-ray wavelengths are comparable with inter-atomic distances (~ 150 pm) and thus are an excellent probe for this length scale.

Bragg condition 

Bragg diffraction occurs when radiation of wavelength  comparable to atomic spacings, is scattered in a specular fashion (mirror-like reflection) by the atoms of a crystalline system, and undergoes constructive interference. 
For a crystalline solid, the waves are scattered from lattice planes separated by the distance  between successive layers of atoms. When the scattered waves interfere constructively they remain in phase. They are reflected only when they strike the surface at a definite angle, the glancing angle (optics)  (see figure on the right, and note that this differs from the convention in Snell's law where  is measured from the surface normal), the wavelength , and the "grating constant" 
of the crystal being connected by the relation:

 is the diffraction order ( is first order,   is second order,  is third order). The effect of the constructive or destructive interference intensifies because of the cumulative effect of reflection in successive crystallographic planes (h,k,l) of the crystalline lattice (as described by Miller notation). This leads to Bragg's law, which describes the condition on θ for the constructive interference to be at its strongest:

Note that moving particles, including electrons, protons and neutrons, have an associated wavelength called de Broglie wavelength. A diffraction pattern is obtained by measuring the intensity of scattered waves as a function of scattering angle. Very strong intensities known as Bragg peaks are obtained in the diffraction pattern at the points where the scattering angles satisfy Bragg condition. As mentioned in the introduction, this condition is a special case of the more general Laue equations, and the Laue equations can be shown to reduce to the Bragg condition under additional assumptions.

The phenomenon of Bragg diffraction by a crystal lattice shares similar characteristics with that of thin film interference, which has an identical condition in the limit where the refractive indices of the surrounding medium (e.g. air) and the interfering medium (e.g. oil) are equal.

Underpinning scattering processes 
When X-rays are incident on an atom, they make the electronic cloud move, as does any electromagnetic wave. The movement of these charges re-radiates waves with the same frequency, blurred slightly due to a variety of effects; this phenomenon is known as Rayleigh scattering (or elastic scattering). The scattered waves can themselves be scattered but this secondary scattering is assumed to be negligible.

A similar process occurs upon scattering neutron waves from the nuclei or by a coherent spin interaction with an unpaired electron. These re-emitted wave fields interfere with each other either constructively or destructively (overlapping waves either add up together to produce stronger peaks or are subtracted from each other to some degree), producing a diffraction pattern on a detector or film.  The resulting wave interference pattern is the basis of diffraction analysis. This analysis is called Bragg diffraction.

Heuristic derivation 
Suppose that a single monochromatic wave (of any type) is incident on aligned planes of lattice points, with separation , at angle .  Points A and C are on one plane, and B is on the plane below.  Points ABCC' form a quadrilateral.

There will be a path difference between the ray that gets reflected along AC' and the ray that gets transmitted along AB, then reflected along BC. This path difference is

The two separate waves will arrive at a point (infinitely displaced from these lattice planes) with the same phase, and hence undergo constructive interference, if and only if this path difference is equal to any integer value of the wavelength, i.e.

Therefore,

from which it follows that

Putting everything together,

If only two planes of atoms were diffracting, as shown in the pictures, then the transition from constructive to destructive interference would be gradual as a function of angle, with gentle maxima at the Bragg angles. However, since many atomic planes are participating interference in most real materials, very sharp peaks surrounded by mostly destructive interference result.

A rigorous derivation from the more general Laue equations is available (see page: Laue equations).

Bragg scattering of visible light by colloids 
A colloidal crystal is a highly ordered array of particles that forms over a long range (from a few millimeters to one centimeter in length); colloidal crystals have appearance and properties roughly analogous to their atomic or molecular counterparts. It has been known for many years that, due to repulsive Coulombic interactions, electrically charged macromolecules in an aqueous environment can exhibit long-range crystal-like correlations, with interparticle separation distances often being considerably greater than the individual particle diameter. Periodic arrays of spherical particles give rise to interstitial voids (the spaces between the particles), which act as a natural diffraction grating for visible light waves, when the interstitial spacing is of the same order of magnitude as the incident lightwave. In these cases in nature, brilliant iridescence (or play of colours) is attributed to the diffraction and constructive interference of visible lightwaves according to Bragg's law, in a matter analogous to the scattering of X-rays in crystalline solid. The effects occur at visible wavelengths because the separation parameter  is much larger than for true crystals. Precious opal is one example of colloidal crystals producing striking optical effects.

Volume Bragg gratings 

Volume Bragg gratings (VBG) or volume holographic gratings (VHG) consist of a volume where there is a periodic change in the refractive index. Depending on the orientation of the modulation of the refractive index, VBG can be used either to transmit or reflect a small bandwidth of wavelengths. Bragg's law (adapted for volume hologram) dictates which wavelength will be diffracted:

where  is the Bragg order (a positive integer),  the diffracted wavelength, Λ the fringe spacing of the grating,  the angle between the incident beam and the normal of the entrance surface and  the angle between the normal and the grating vector. Radiation that does not match Bragg's law will pass through the VBG undiffracted. The output wavelength can be tuned over a few hundred nanometers by changing the incident angle. VBG are being used to produce widely tunable laser source or perform global hyperspectral imagery (see Photon etc.).

Selection rules and practical crystallography 
Bragg's law, as stated above, can be used to obtain the lattice spacing of a particular cubic system through the following relation:

Combining this relation with Bragg's law gives:

One can derive selection rules for the Miller indices for different cubic Bravais lattices; here, selection rules for several will be given as is.
	 

These selection rules can be used for any crystal with the given crystal structure. KCl has a face-centered cubic Bravais lattice.  However, the K+ and the Cl− ion have the same number of electrons and are quite close in size, so that the diffraction pattern becomes essentially the same as for a simple cubic structure with half the lattice parameter.  Selection rules for other structures can be referenced elsewhere, or derived. Lattice spacing for the other crystal systems can be found here.

See also 
 Bragg plane
 Crystal lattice
 Diffraction
 Distributed Bragg reflector
 Fiber Bragg grating
 Dynamical theory of diffraction
 Electron diffraction
 Georg Wulff 
 Henderson limit
 Laue conditions
 Powder diffraction
 Radar angels
 Structure factor
 X-ray crystallography

References

Further reading 
 Neil W. Ashcroft and N. David Mermin, Solid State Physics (Harcourt: Orlando, 1976).

External links 
 Nobel Prize in Physics – 1915
 https://web.archive.org/web/20110608141639/http://www.physics.uoguelph.ca/~detong/phys3510_4500/xray.pdf
 Learning crystallography

Diffraction
Neutron
X-rays
Crystallography